Cysteine sulfinic acid is the organic compound with the nominal formula HO2SCH2CH(NH2)CO2H .  It is a rare example of an amino acid bearing a sulfinic acid functional group. It is a white solid that is soluble in water. Like most natural amino acids, it is chiral, only the d-enantiomer occurs in nature, and it exists as the zwitterion at neutral pH.  It is an intermediate in cysteine metabolism.  It is not a coded amino acid, but is produced post-translationally. Peptides containing the cysteine sulfinic acid residue  are substrates for cysteine sulfinic acid reductase.

Cysteine sulfinic acid is derived from cysteine. Cysteine is formed from cystathionine via the cystathionine gamma-lyase enzyme, and is either broken down by cysteine lyase or cystathionine gamma-lyase or enters the cysteine sulfinic acid pathway where it is oxidized by cysteine dioxygenase to form cysteine sulfinic acid. Cysteine sulfinic acid, in turn, is decarboxylated by sulfinoalanine decarboxylase to form hypotaurine, which in turn is oxidized by hypotaurine dehydrogenase to yield taurine. Proteins containing this residue are found at the active site of some nitrile hydratases.

References

Sulfur amino acids
Sulfinic acids